Von Willebrand factor A domain containing 5A is a protein that in humans is encoded by the VWA5A gene.

References

Further reading